A leek is a vegetable belonging to the onion family.

Leek may also refer to:

Places
 Leek, Netherlands
 Leek, Staffordshire, England
 Leek (UK Parliament constituency)
 Leek College, a further education college now named Buxton & Leek College
 Mount Leek, Palmer Land, Antarctica
 Leek Wootton, Warwickshire, England

Other uses
 Leek (surname)

See also
 Leak (disambiguation)
 Leeke (disambiguation)
 Leake (disambiguation)